Bello Bako Dambatta (born 15 December 1950 in Kano, Kano State, Nigeria) is a Nigerian chemist and university administrator.  He served as the vice-chancellor of Bayero University, Kano from 1995 until 1999.

Education and career
Dambatta was born on 15 December 1950 in the city of Kano, Nigeria.  He began his higher education at Kaduna Polytechnic (1970–72), then moved to England, where he attended Huddersfield Polytechnic (1972–74), Trent Polytechnic (1974–75), the University of Bradford (1975–76), and Lancaster University (1980-83).  He completed his PhD at Lancaster University, with a thesis titled A study of the free-radical polymerisations of tri-n-butyltin methacrylate and i-vinylimidazole.

He was appointed as a lecturer at Bayero University, Kano in 1978, and was promoted, reaching full professor in 1994.  He served as the head of the Department of Chemistry from 1991 until 1995, and was dean of the Faculty of Science from 1992 until 1995. He was vice-chancellor of Bayero University from 1995 to 1999, and was the first to be selected by the faculty of the university (previous vice-chancellors had been appointed centrally by the government).

Dambatta became a fellow of the Chemical Society of Nigeria in August 1996.

References 

Dambazawa Family
Living people
1950 births
Academic staff of Bayero University Kano
Alumni of Lancaster University
Alumni of the University of Huddersfield
Alumni of the University of Bradford
Vice-Chancellors of Nigerian universities
Nigerian scientists
People from Kano State